Éder Ferreira Graminho (born 5 April 1995), simply known as Éder, is a Brazilian footballer who currently plays as a central defender for América Mineiro.

Career statistics

Honours
Bahia
 Copa do Nordeste: 2017

Athletico Paranaense
 Campeonato Paranaense: 2019

Atlético Goianiense
 Campeonato Goiano: 2020

References

External links

1995 births
Living people
Sportspeople from Tocantins
Brazilian footballers
Association football defenders
Campeonato Brasileiro Série A players
Campeonato Brasileiro Série B players
Esporte Clube Bahia players
Grêmio Novorizontino players
Club Athletico Paranaense players
Sport Club do Recife players
Atlético Clube Goianiense players
América Futebol Clube (MG) players